Herbert Horatio Spencer Westmacott (10 November 1885 – 26 January 1960) was a notable New Zealand farmer, soldier and memoirist. He was born in Christchurch,  New Zealand in 1885.

References

1885 births
1960 deaths
New Zealand autobiographers
New Zealand military personnel
People from Christchurch